El Higo may refer to:
 El Higo, Veracruz, Mexico
 El Higo Municipality, Veracruz, Mexico
 El Higo, Panama